HD 222582 b is an extrasolar planet that is 8.37 times the mass of Jupiter orbiting the star HD 222582. The orbital period is 572 days and orbits at a semimajor axis of 1.35 AU in one of the most eccentric orbits of any known planets.

See also
 Gas giant

References

External links
 
  Simulation
 
 
 

Aquarius (constellation)
Giant planets in the habitable zone
Exoplanets discovered in 1999
Exoplanets detected by radial velocity

de:HD 222582 b